Alun John Hawkins  (born 28 May 1944) is an Anglican priest. He was the Dean of Bangor from 2004 to 2011.

Born on 28 May 1944 and educated at King's College London he was a Lecturer in English and Drama  at UCNW, Bangor until his ordination in 1981.

After a curacy at Dwygyfylchi he was Rector of Llanberis and then Vicar of Knighton and Norton. He was a Canon Residentiary at Bangor Cathedral from 1993 and Archdeacon of Bangor from 2000 until his appointment to the deanery.

Following controversial remarks concerning his successor as Archbishop of Canterbury by retired archbishop George Carey, Hawkins imposed on the latter a banning order at Bangor Cathedral.

References

1944 births
Alumni of King's College London
Academics of Bangor University
Archdeacons of Bangor
Deans of Bangor
Living people